Thionia simplex is a species of issid planthopper in the family Issidae.

References

Further reading

External links

 

Issidae
Insects described in 1830